Houcine (variant Hocine (both derivations of Arabic Hussein, Hussayn) may refer to:

Given name
Houcine Anafal (1952–2012), Moroccan professional football player
Houcine Bennoui (born 1989), French Muay Thai kickboxer
Houcine Camara, French singer, better known by his mononym Houcine
Houcine Dimassi (born 1948), Tunisian politician
Houcine Slaoui (1918–1951), real name Houcine Ben Bouchaïb, Moroccan singer and composer
Houcine Toulali (1924–1998), Moroccan writer and singer of malhun compositions

Family name
Khaled Houcine, Tunisian sprint canoeist

See also
Hocine (disambiguation)
Hussein